Julian Lim is a historian teaching at Arizona State University. Her research focuses on race, sovereignty, and refugee law in the Mexico-U.S. borderlands region. Her first monograph Porous Borders: Multiracial Migrations and the Law in the U.S.-Mexico Borderlands was published in 2017 by the University of North Carolina Press. The text won multiple awards, including the David J. Weber-Clements Center Prize, the Outstanding Achievement in History award from the Association for Asian American Studies, and the Humanities Book Award from the Institute for Humanities Research.

Lim was born in the San Francisco Bay Area. She attended UC Berkeley for undergrad and law school. She received her doctorate from Cornell University in 2013, where she was a student of Maria Cristina Garcia and Derek Chang. Her work has focused primarily on analyzing the racialization of Asian Pacific Americans in the United States. Lim is an active member in the Western History Association.

References

Arizona State University faculty
21st-century American historians
21st-century American male writers
Cornell University alumni
Year of birth missing (living people)
Living people
American male non-fiction writers